Oudhuizen is a former village in the Dutch province of Utrecht. It is now a neighbourhood on the eastern side of the village of Wilnis.

Oudhuizen was a separate municipality from 1818 to 1857, when it was merged with Wilnis.

References

Former municipalities of Utrecht (province)